is a velodrome located in Ōmiya-ku, Saitama that conducts pari-mutuel Keirin racing - one of Japan's four authorized  where gambling is permitted. Its Keirin identification number for betting purposes is 25# (25 sharp).

Ōmiya's oval is 500 meters in circumference. A typical keirin race of 2,025 meters consists of four laps around the course.

Inside the keirin oval is a 400-meter running track used for track and field athletics events which hosted the 1962 National Athletics Championships.

External links
Ōmiya Keirin Home Page (Japanese)
keirin.jp Ōmiya Information (Japanese)

Athletics (track and field) venues in Japan
Velodromes in Japan
Cycle racing in Japan
Sports venues in Saitama (city)